Qasim Akhgar (Persian: قسیم اخگر) was an author, researcher, civil society activist and theorist in Afghanistan.

Early life 
Qasim Akhgar was born in 1951 in Wazirabad area of Kabul.
He continued his elementary and secondary school in Kabul, while his education was not over he was arrested and expelled from the school due to participation in political struggles and demonstrations of Leftist groups. 
During the Taliban he migrated to neighboring countries, after the fall of the Taliban he returned to Afghanistan and began his political, social and journalistic activities in Kabul.

Qasim Akhgar was an ethnic Hazara.

Death 
Qasim Akhbar died on 28 January 2014 in Kabul due to a heart attack.

Notes

References 
 afghanistan-analysts.org/Qasim Akhgar
 bbc.com/Akhgar passed away
 bakhtarnews.com.af
 farsnews.com

1951 births
2014 deaths
Afghan activists
Afghan male writers
20th-century Afghan writers
21st-century Afghan writers
Afghan journalists
Hazara writers
Hazara people
People from Kabul